James Douglas (Northwood Green, Middlesex 8 January 1870 – Cheltenham, Gloucestershire 8 February 1958) was an English first-class cricketer.

Douglas was educated at Dulwich and Selwyn College, Cambridge. He was a right-handed batsman and a slow left-arm bowler for Cambridge University (three blues) and Middlesex.

He came from a cricketing family. His brothers A.P., Robert and Sholto also played first-class cricket.

References

External links
 Cricinfo
 Cricket Archive

1870 births
1958 deaths
Cambridge University cricketers
English cricketers
Middlesex cricketers
People educated at Dulwich College
Alumni of Selwyn College, Cambridge
Gentlemen cricketers
Marylebone Cricket Club cricketers
C. I. Thornton's XI cricketers
North v South cricketers
Earl De La Warr's XI cricketers